Rena Dor (1917 – March 5, 2000) was a Greek actress and a singer. 

She was born Irini Giannatou (Ειρήνη Γιαννάτου) in Patras in 1917 and died in Athens on March 5, 2000.  She is buried at Athens First Cemetery.  She entered the musical theatre.  Companioned her lift that she had other actors such as Alekos Leivaditis.  She was orphaned from age four and had only nine sisters. She first played for her first time at 113, mainly as a dancer with Zozo Dalma in a periodical that performed in Egypt.  Her first theatrical work along with Marika Krevata and Mimi Kokkini and in 1954 with Krevata, Rena Vlachopoulou.  She awarded herseft the Panathinaia (Pan-Athenian awards) for her totaling her presentation in the dancing.  Her last appearance was in 1978 at the Minoa theatre with N. Eleftheriou Ti Kostakis, ti Antdikos ta plironei o laoutzikos (Τι Κωστάκης, τι Αντρίκος, τα πληρώνει ο λαουτζίκος)

Filmography

Film

Theater

External links

1917 births
2000 deaths
Greek actresses
Actors from Patras
Musicians from Patras
20th-century Greek women singers
20th-century Greek actresses